The 1936 Penn State Nittany Lions football team represented the Pennsylvania State University in the 1936 college football season.

Schedule

References

Penn State
Penn State Nittany Lions football seasons
Penn State Nittany Lions football